Stadio Guido Teghil is a stadium in Lignano Sabbiadoro, Italy. It has a capacity of over 5,000.

It was the host for Italy v Spain in the 2021 Rugby League World Cup qualifiers in November 2019. It is also the current home venue of association football Serie B club Pordenone for the 2020–21 season.

Facilities

The main ground has a capacity 5,000.  It has four football pitches and a six lane athletic track with lighting for all.

Sources

Rugby league stadiums in Italy
Event venues with year of establishment missing
Sports venues in Friuli-Venezia Giulia
Buildings and structures in the Province of Udine